Javier Cortés Granados (born 20 July 1989) is a former Mexican professional footballer who played as a midfielder. He is an Olympic gold medalist.

Club career

International career
He was on the Mexico national football team in the gold medal match at the 2012 Summer Olympics in which Mexico defeated Brazil, by a score of 2–1.

Cortés has capped twice for the Mexico national team.

Career statistics

International

Honours
UNAM
Mexican Primera División: Clausura 2011

Santos Laguna
Liga MX: Clausura 2018

Mexico U23
CONCACAF Olympic Qualifying Championship: 2012
Toulon Tournament: 2012
Olympic Gold Medal: 2012

References

External links
 
 
 

1989 births
Living people
Footballers from Mexico City
Association football midfielders
Mexico youth international footballers
Mexico international footballers
Olympic footballers of Mexico
Footballers at the 2012 Summer Olympics
Olympic gold medalists for Mexico
Olympic medalists in football
Medalists at the 2012 Summer Olympics
2013 CONCACAF Gold Cup players
Club Universidad Nacional footballers
Santos Laguna footballers
Liga MX players
2009 CONCACAF U-20 Championship players
21st-century Mexican people
Mexican footballers